"Sugar" is a song by German DJ and record producer Robin Schulz. It features the vocals from Canadian singer Francesco Yates. The song was released in Germany on 17 July 2015 as the second single from his second studio album of the same name. It interpolates Baby Bash's 2003 single "Suga Suga".

Music video
The music video for this song was released onto YouTube on 24 July 2015 and runs for a total length of three minutes and forty-two seconds. Yates is seen in the video along with a rogue police officer, Officer Finkleman (played by comedian Nathan Barnatt), who gyrates and grooves to the tune of the song while driving. Schulz also appears on a billboard for a concert. In the end, references are made to the music video of Baby Bash's Suga Suga when the police officer dresses in the clothes that match those of Baby Bash in that video: a green T-shirt over a white T-shirt, baggy jeans, a chain and a white beanie. At the end of the video, his car meets an accident and tumbles upside down, albeit still leaving the officer dancing as additional police cars arrive at the scene.

Chart performance
The song has become Schulz's most successful song from the album. "Sugar" was a hit in many European countries, peaking atop the singles chart of seven countries including Austria, Germany and Switzerland where it became his third chart-topper single in all these countries following 2014's singles "Waves" and "Prayer in C". It also attained to peak at number one in the Czech Republic, Hungary, Poland, and Slovenia. In the United Kingdom, "Sugar" outperformed the album's lead single "Headlights" charting in the Top 40 at number 21 and was certified Gold by the BPI.

In the United States, the song also became a hit, charting on the Billboard Hot 100 chart at number 44, where it became his third highest-charting single after "Waves" at #14, and "Prayer in C" at #23, in 2014. "Sugar" is the only song from the album to chart on the Billboard Hot 100, and was certified platinum by the Recording Industry Association of America (RIAA).

The song was certified gold in Austria and the UK, platinum in the US, and double platinum in Australia, Germany, and Switzerland, and five-time platinum in Italy.

It was used in a commercial for the Walmart brands George, Time and Tru and Wonder Nation clothing brands.

Track listing

Charts

Weekly charts

Year-end charts

Certifications

Release history

References

2015 songs
2015 singles
Number-one singles in Austria
Number-one singles in Germany
Number-one singles in Switzerland
Tropical house songs
Songs written by Happy Perez
Songs written by Robin Schulz
Robin Schulz songs
Songs written by Jürgen Dohr